Yosef Hadane (b. 1949) is an Ethiopian Jewish rabbi who immigrated to Israel.

Biography 
Hadane was born to a prominent Kes, Raphael Hadane. Later in the 1970's he immigrated to Israel as a boy, already speaking English.

In 1979 Hadane became the first Ethiopian Israeli to receive Orthodox semicha in Israel, after having studied in Israel and Italy. 

Hadane began working for the Ministry of Religious Services in 1979. 

Hadane later joined his brother Emanuel Hadane arguing on behalf of the right of the Falash Mura to make aliyah. This behavior was brought to the forefront by his public criticism of the Petah Tikva practices towards Ethiopian Jews.

In June of 2016, Hadane was informed by the Ministry of Religious Services that he would be forced to retire as branch head of the ministry. Tzohar claimed that he was forced to retire for supporting the Falash Mura's right to marriage equality. The Ministry claimed that he had simply reached the standard age of retirement. Ultimately he was given just a six month extension as a result of public outcry.

Hadane stepped down in 2017 as chief rabbi of the Ethiopian community, being succeeded by Reuven Wabashat.

References 

1949 births
Living people
Israeli people of Ethiopian-Jewish descent
Kahant (Beta Israel)